Niki Nana is the fifth studio album by Greek keyboardist and composer Yanni, released in August 1989 by Private Music.

Background
By 1989, Yanni had released four studio albums, the most of recent of which was Chameleon Days (1988). When he started work on a follow-up record, he took a musical departure as he had explored music of an orchestral nature on his first three albums, in particular using synthesised strings. For Niki Nana, Yanni incorporated more rock-oriented arrangements with rhythm dominating the music, for which he used his time playing in rock bands in his early career as inspiration.

"Niki Nana (We're One)" started as an instrumental track and Yanni felt it had a celebratory feel, hearing "people singing and dancing" of a South American or African flavour. He then decided to incorporate words from the Greek, Zulu, English, and Spanish language as an attempt to present the theme of unity.

Yanni dedicated the album to his parents, Sotiri and Felitsa, in the liner notes.

Release

The album peaked at No. 2 on the Billboard New Age albums chart.

In 1992, lyrics in Greek were written for the track "Nightbird" by Greek lyricist Tasoula Thomaïdou. The song was called "Mia Ellada Fos" (A whole Greece of Light) and was performed by the Greek-Cypriot singer Konstantina in her personal album of the same name in 1992.

Track listing

Personnel
"Niki Nana":
Lyrics:  Tom Sterling and Yanni
Vocal Arrangement:  Morgan Ames
Choir recorded by Hank Cicalo at Alpha Studios, Los Angeles
Lead Vocal - Carmen Twillie
2nd Lead Vocal - Venette Gloud
Guitars - Joaquin Lievano
Morgan Ames Choir - Venette Gloud, Clydene Jackson-Edwards, Angel Rogers, Carmen Twillie, Randy Crenshaw, Arnold McCuller, Josef Powell, Tim Stone, Terry Young.
Special thanks to Bo Russell and Bonnie Fury for their help on this song.

"Dance with a Stranger":
Flugelhorn and Trumpet - Nolan Smith, Jr.
Flugelhorn - Ralf Rickert
Guitars - Joaquin Lievanno

"Running Time":
Trumpet - Jerry Hey
Trumpet - Gary Grant
Saxophone - Dan Higgins
Trombone - Bill Reichenbach Jr.
Guitars - Joaquin Lievanno
Vocals - Carolyn Johnson-White
Horns recorded at John Tesh's private studio

"Human Condition":
Lead Vocals - Carmen Twillie
Additional Vocals - Venette Gloud

"Nightbird":
Bouzouki - Spiro Katsemeges
Guitars - Joaquin Lievano
Sound effect design by Larson Sound Center
Sound effect created by Russell Brower
Acoustic, electronic drums and percussion - Charlie Adams

Production
 All music composed and produced by Yanni
 Produced by Peter Baumann

References

External links
Official Website

Yanni albums
1989 albums